Juan Tavera (1917–1991) was a Chilean geologist and paleontologist. His most important work was on the marine invertebrate fossils of the formations of  Algarrobo, Arauco and Navidad. Tavera's work contributed to an increased understanding of the stratigraphy of Chile, for example by defining Ranquil Formation in 1942.

Along with Charles Darwin, Juan Brüggen and Gustav Steinmann he is one of the prominent geologists to have studied Navidad Formation in Central Chile.

The species Paulckella taverai is named after him.

References

20th-century Chilean geologists
Chilean paleontologists
Paleozoologists
1917 births
1991 deaths
20th-century zoologists